Kicha Vayasu 16 is a 2005 Indian Tamil language film directed by A. N. Rajagopal starring Simran and Manikandan, with Jai Akash and Sujibala in supporting roles. The film centers around the antics of the eponymous character, Kicha, with other teenagers in the city of Nagercoil. The music was composed by Dhina. The film released on 25 March 2005.

Plot
Krishnamoorthy (Jai Akash), known as Kicha in his youth, is the District Collector who returns to his childhood city of Nagercoil to demolish an old school, which he recognises as his former school. His reminiscences of his school days in Nagercoil form the main theme of the film.

The film then transitions to when Kicha (Manikandan) is a 16-year-old boy. After Nirmala (Simran), a teacher whom Kicha has a crush on, becomes the headmistress of their school, Kicha, who often teases people around him, becomes very well-behaved towards Nirmala. Because of this, he often garners her support. However, Kicha, being his usual self, begins leading a group of errant boys who perform various misdemeanors around their town. This includes stealing and selling dishes from the school and eating in hotel restaurants without paying the bill.

Kicha and his friends are finally caught when they attempt to escape after not paying a hotel bill. The hotel owner thrashes them so thoroughly that the other boys inform the owner on Kicha and claim that he taught them to do such things. When the boys' parents are notified of this, many become angry, claiming that Kicha has misled their children and made them wayward. Soon after, Kicha acts up toward a girl in the neighborhood. After she makes his bad behavior public, Kicha travels out of embarrassment to Madurai with his elder brother. However, Kicha's schoolmates steal from the school in his absence and accuse Kicha of having done so. The headmistress, Nirmala, who has a good opinion of Kicha, summons him from Madurai for enquiries. After Nirmala decides that Kicha is guilty, she feels deeply let down and curses him for never being up to any good. Kicha returns to Madurai, studies with a vengeance, and eventually returns to Nagercoil as the Collector.

In Nagercoil, Kicha travels to Nirmala's home to visit her but finds that she is out of the country and is expected to return after six months. Kicha plans to marry Subbu (Sujibala), who had been in love with him. After Kicha arrives at Subbu's house, she is very enthusiastic to see him again and leaves with Kicha.

Nirmala is portrayed as an ideal headmistress: she is strict towards her students when required and lenient when being so is appropriate.

Cast

Simran as Nirmala
Manikandan as Teenage Kicha (aged 16)
Jai Akash as Krishnamoorthy (Older Kicha)
Sujibala as Subbu
Sweatha Bharathi as Kicha's friend
Pandu
T. P. Gajendran as Kicha's father
Vaiyapuri as Kicha's elder brother 
Benjamin
Aarthi as Teacher
King Kong as Student
Kumarimuthu
 Gowthami Vembunathan
Deepak Bagga (cameo)

Production 
The film was initially announced with the title Kichavin Kathal. The film was later titled Kicha Vayadhu 16 and it was to be produced by Ramoji Rao and star Richard Rishi. Manikandan was cast in the role of a teenager. Deepak Bagga, Simran's real life husband was to replace Jai Akash in the film, but later decided not to. His portions with Simran were retained in the film. Simran had a baby boy and later returned to shooting. Shooting finished in January 2005.

Soundtrack
The music composed by Dhina, with lyrics written by P. Vijay, Snehan, and Yugabharathi.

Release 
Balaji Balasubramaniam of BB Thots gave the film a rating of one-half out of five stars and opined that "But the director is unable to stick to even this storyline. So he makes some detours that pull the movie's quality even further down".

References

2005 films
2000s Tamil-language films